Skylarking is a 1986 album by XTC. The title is another way of saying "fooling around".

Skylarking or Skylarkin may also refer to:
 Skylarking (Horace Andy album), 1972
 Skylarkin' (Mic Christopher album), 2001
 ''Skylarkin''' (Grover Washington, Jr. album), 1980
 Skylarking (birds), refers to the aerial displays including song made by various species of birds

See also
Sky Larkin, a UK indie rock band
Skylark (disambiguation)